Kiryl Aleksiyan (born 22 January 1991) is a Belarusian professional footballer who is currently playing for Orsha.

Career
Aleksiyan made his first steps in football with Smena Minsk before joining BATE Borisov in 2008. He initially represented the reserve team and made his debut for the senior BATE side in September 2009. In 2017 he played for Jonava.

Honours
BATE Borisov
Belarusian Premier League champion: 2011

References

External links
 
 

1991 births
Living people
Belarusian footballers
Association football midfielders
Belarusian expatriate footballers
Expatriate footballers in Croatia
Expatriate footballers in Lithuania
Belarusian expatriate sportspeople in Lithuania
A Lyga players
FC BATE Borisov players
FC Dynamo Brest players
FC Gomel players
FC Granit Mikashevichi players
NK Hrvatski Dragovoljac players
FC Smolevichi players
FC Torpedo Minsk players
FK Jonava players
FC Krumkachy Minsk players
FC Volna Pinsk players
FC Orsha players
Belarusian people of Armenian descent